Tinning is a surname. Notable people with the surname include:

Iben Tinning (born 1974), Danish golfer
Marybeth Tinning (born 1942), American serial killer
Steen Tinning (born 1962), Danish golfer